Solo Saxophone Concerts is an album by American jazz saxophonist Roscoe Mitchell composed of solo concert performances from 1973 and 1974 and released on the Canadian Sackville label. It was reissued in 2009 by AECO/Katalyst under the title The Solo Concert.

Reception

In his review for AllMusic, Michael G. Nastos states "This is the first, greatest, and premier solo recording by Roscoe Mitchell that has to go down as one of his all-time best, and a prime example of how to stand alone, unafraid of any preconceived notions in how modern jazz should sound or be performed."

Track listing
All compositions by Roscoe Mitchell except as indicated
 "Nonaah" - 1:20 
 "Tutankamen" (Malachi Favors) - 7:00
 "Enlorfe" - 2:54
 "Jibbana" - 4:51
 "Eeltwo (Part One)" - 2:53
 "Eeltwo (Part Two)" - 6:23
 "Oobina (Little Big Horn)" - 4:38
 "Ttum" - 8:56
 "Nonaah" - 1:28

Personnel
Roscoe Mitchell - soprano sax, alto sax, tenor sax, bass sax

References

1974 live albums
Roscoe Mitchell live albums
Sackville Records live albums